Donald Marshall may refer to:

 Donald Marshall Jr. (1953–2009), Mi'kmaq man wrongly convicted of murder
 Donald Marshall Sr. (1925–1991), his father, Grand Chief of the Mi'kmaq
 Donald Albert Marshall (born 1932), Canadian politician in the Legislative Assembly of British Columbia
 Don Marshall (born 1932), Canadian ice hockey player
 Don Marshall (actor) (1936–2016), American actor